Viola Namuddu (born 1994 or 1995) is a Ugandan footballer who plays as a midfielder for FUFA Women Super League club Makerere University and the Uganda women's national team.

Club career 
Namuddu has played for Makerere University in Uganda.

International career 
Namuddu capped for Uganda at senior level during the 2021 COSAFA Women's Championship.

References 

1990s births
Living people
Ugandan women's footballers
Women's association football midfielders
Uganda women's international footballers